Clearview AI is an American facial recognition company, providing software to companies, law enforcement, universities, and individuals. The company's algorithm matches faces to a database of more than 20 billion images indexed from the Internet, including social media applications. Founded by Hoan Ton-That and Richard Schwartz, the company maintained a low profile until late 2019, when its usage by law enforcement was reported on. Multiple reports identified Clearview's association with far-right personas dating back to 2016, when the company claimed to sever ties with two employees.

In January 2020, Twitter sent a cease and desist letter and requested the deletion of all collected data. This was followed by similar actions by YouTube (via Google) and Facebook in February. Clearview sells access to its database to law enforcement agencies and has 3,100 active users including the Federal Bureau of Investigation and the Department of Homeland Security according to The Wall Street Journal. However, contrary to Clearview's claims that its service is sold only to law enforcement, a data breach in early 2020 revealed that numerous commercial organizations were on Clearview's customer list. A spokesperson for the company claimed its valuation to be more than $100 million. In 2021, Time magazine named Clearview AI as one of the 100 most influential companies of the year.
In March 2022 Clearview AI was fined $20M by the Italian Privacy Regulator ("Garante della privacy") in violation of the GDPR and has been required to delete all Italian records from its database. Similar fines and deletion orders followed in Australia, France, and the United Kingdom. In May 2022 Clearview agreed to settle a 2020 lawsuit in the United States from the American Civil Liberties Union, which prohibited the sale of its facial recognition database to private individuals and businesses. Clearview paid $250,000 in legal fees and agreed to limit its 20 billion facial photo database to government agencies.

History 
Clearview operated in near secrecy until the release of The New York Times exposé titled "The Secretive Company That Might End Privacy as We Know It" in January 2020. Citing the article, over 40 tech and civil rights organizations including Color of Change, Council on American–Islamic Relations, Demand Progress, Electronic Frontier Foundation, Electronic Privacy Information Center, Fight for the Future, Freedom of the Press Foundation, Media Alliance, National Center for Transgender Equality, National Hispanic Media Coalition, National LGBTQ Task Force, Project On Government Oversight, Restore the Fourth, Surveillance Technology Oversight Project, and the Woodhull Freedom Foundation sent a letter to the Privacy and Civil Liberties Oversight Board (PCLOB) and four congressional committees, outlining their concerns with facial recognition and Clearview, asking the PCLOB to suspend the use of facial recognition. The exposé also identified Hoan Ton-That and Richard Schwartz as the company's founders with investors including Peter Thiel. It was reported that Ton-That and Schwartz met at the Manhattan Institute.

Early use of Clearview's app was described as a perk given to potential investors in their Series A fundraising round. Billionaire John Catsimatidis used it to identify someone his daughter dated and piloted it at one of his Gristedes grocery market in New York City to identify shoplifters. Noted far-right "troll king" Charles C. Johnson had an account on Clearview as well as Tor Ekeland and Palmer Luckey. The AI Now Institute linked Clearview with the Banjo surveillance platform, as both have far-right ties, though Banjo does not have the explicit far-right algorithmic goals that Clearview does.

It accelerated a global debate on the regulation of facial recognition technology by governments and law enforcement. Law enforcement officers have stated that Clearview's facial recognition is far superior in identifying perpetrators from any angle than previously used technology. After discovering Clearview AI was scraping images from their site, Twitter sent a cease-and-desist letter, insisting that they remove all images as it is against Twitter's policies. Facebook has said they are reviewing the situation, and Venmo also stated it is against their policies. On February 5 and 6, 2020, Google, YouTube, Facebook, and Venmo sent cease and desist letters as it is against their policies. Ton-That responded in an interview with Errol Barnett of CBS This Morning that there is a First Amendment right to access public data, identification results were 99.6% accurate. He later stated that Clearview has scraped over 10 billion images from across the web.

In February 2020, multiple sources reported that Clearview AI had experienced a data breach, exposing its list of customers. Clearview's attorney, Tor Ekeland stated the flaw was corrected.

In April 2020, TechCrunch reported that Mossab Hussein of SpiderSilk, a security firm, discovered Clearview's source code repositories had been exposed with a misconfigured user security setting. This included secret keys and credentials, including cloud storage and Slack tokens. The compiled apps and pre-release apps were accessible, allowing Hussein to run the macOS and iOS apps against Clearview's services. While Ton-That called Hussein's disclosure of the bug extortion, Hussein reported the breach to Clearview but refused to sign a non-disclosure agreement necessary for the program. He also found 70,000 videos in one storage bucket from a Rudin Management apartment building's entrance.

A Huffington Post story published in April 2020 identified a Slack channel from 2016 that was created by Charles C. Johnson and Pax Dickinson called WeSearchr taken from a crowd-funding site of the same name. Channel members included Ton-That, Schwartz, Marko Jukic, Tyler Bass and Douglass Mackey who all worked for Smartcheckr, Clearview's original name before rebranding. Mackey was associated with alt-right white supremacist congressional candidate Paul Nehlen. Clearview claimed to have had no knowledge of Mackey's persona, though Mackey was also part of the WeSearchr Slack under his fake name. After Mackey's persona was revealed, Schwartz used a reputation management company to obscure his involvement with Smartcheckr.

In September 2020, it was reported that Clearview had raised $8.625 million in equity sales during a funding round. The company's SEC filing did not disclose investors in the round. Before the deal, Clearview has raised a total of $8.4 million from investors including Kirenaga Partners and Peter Thiel. After the 2021 storming of the United States Capitol, the Oxford Police Department in Alabama used Clearview's software to run a number of images posted by the Federal Bureau of Investigation in its public request for suspect information to generate leads for people present during the riot. Photo matches and information were sent to the FBI who declined to comment on its techniques.

In December 2020, the ACLU of Washington sent a letter to Seattle mayor Jenny Durkan, asking her to ban the Seattle Police Department from using Clearview AI. The letter cited public records retrieved by a local blogger, which showed one officer signing up for and repeatedly logging into the service, as well as corresponding with a company representative. While the ACLU letter raised concerns that the officer's usage violated the Seattle Surveillance Ordinance, an auditor at the City of Seattle Office of the Inspector General argued that the ordinance was designed to address the usage of surveillance technologies by the Department itself, not by an officer without the Department's knowledge.

In April 2021, documents obtained by the Legal Aid Society under New York's Freedom Of Information Law demonstrated Clearview's expansive, multi-year collaboration with the NYPD. These records demonstrated, contrary to past NYPD denials, that Clearview provided accounts to numerous NYPD officers, met with senior NYPD leadership, and entered into a vendor contract with the NYPD. Clearview came under renewed scrutiny for enabling officers to conduct large numbers of searches without formal oversight or approval. In on-boarding emails, new users were encouraged to go beyond running one or two searches to "[s]ee if you can reach 100 searches".

The company announced its first chief strategy officer, chief revenue officer and chief marketing officer in May 2021. Devesh Ashra, a former deputy assistant secretary with the United States Department of the Treasury, became its chief strategy officer. Chris Metaxas, a former executive at LexisNexis Risk Solutions, became its chief revenue officer. Susan Crandall, a former marketing executive at LexisNexis Risk Solutions and Motorola Solutions, became its chief marketing officer. Later that month, the company had numerous legal complaints filed in Austria, France, Greece, Italy and the United Kingdom for violating European privacy laws in its method of documenting and collecting Internet data.

In August 2021, Clearview AI announced the formation of an advisory board including Raymond Kelly, Richard A. Clarke, Rudy Washington, Floyd Abrams, Lee S. Wolosky, and Owen West. The company claimed to have scraped more than 10 billion images in October 2021.

In March 2022, Ton-That told Reuters that Ukraine's Ministry of Defence began using Clearview AI's facial recognition technology on March 12, 2022 after the startup "offered to uncover Russian assailants, combat misinformation and identify the dead". Ton-That also claimed that they have "more than 2 billion images from the Russian social media service VKontakte at its disposal". In April 2022, the New York Times reported that Clearview had created over 200 accounts for users at five Ukrainian government agencies, which have conducted more than 5,000 searches, and that Clearview has also translated its app into Ukrainian. Ton-That provided emails from officials of three agencies in Ukraine, confirming that they had used the tool to identify dead soldiers and prisoners of war, as well as travelers in the country.

In May 2022, Clearview AI announced that it would be expanding sales of its facial recognition software to the private-sector (in particular apps and school management systems), scraping images from social media profiles.

Marketing efforts and pushback
Clearview's marketing claimed their facial recognition led to a terrorist arrest. The identification was submitted to the New York Police Department tip line, but the NYPD did not use this tip to identify the suspect, and stated they have no institutional relationship with Clearview, though some 'rogue officers' use it. Clearview claims to have solved two other New York cases and 40 cold cases, later stating they submitted them to tip lines.

The company was sent a cease and desist letter from the office of New Jersey Attorney General Gurbir Grewal after including a promotional video on its website with the images of Grewal. Clearview had claimed that its app played a role in a New Jersey police sting, which Grewal confirmed had been used to identify one of the child predators. He banned the use of Clearview in all 21 counties in New Jersey. Tor Ekeland, a lawyer for Clearview, confirmed the marketing video was taken down the same day.

On March 17, 2020, The Wall Street Journal stated that Clearview was pitching their technology to states for use in contact tracing to assist with the COVID-19 pandemic. Fight for the Future's responded by calling Clearview a cartoonishly shady surveillance vendor, and the idea was met with overall backlash.

Senator Edward J. Markey wrote Clearview and Ton-That, stating "Widespread use of your technology could facilitate dangerous behavior and could effectively destroy individuals' ability to go about their daily lives anonymously." Markey asked Clearview to detail aspects of its business to understand these privacy, bias, and security concerns. Clearview responded through an attorney, declining to reveal information. In response to this, Markey wrote a second letter, calling their response unacceptable and containing dubious claims, highlighting the concern of Clearview "selling its technology to authoritarian regimes" and possible violations of COPPA. Senator Markey wrote his third letter to the company with concerns, stating "this health crisis cannot justify using unreliable surveillance tools that could undermine our privacy rights." Markey asked a series of questions about what government entities Clearview has been talking with, in addition to unanswered privacy concerns.

Senator Ron Wyden voiced concerns about Clearview and had meetings with Ton-That cancelled on three occasions.

In May 2022, under the terms of an ACLU settlement, Clearview agreed to a permanent ban from selling its facial recognition database to private companies.

Technology 
Clearview states their technology is not for public consumption and meant for law enforcement usage, but their marketing material encouraged users to "run wild" with their use, suggesting searching for family and friends as well as celebrities. Clearview also indicated they were targeting private security firms and marketed to casinos through Clearview's Jessica Medeiros Garrison. Clearview planned expansion to many countries, including Brazil, Colombia, and Nigeria, a cluster that Buzzfeed titles "authoritarian regimes" including United Arab Emirates, Qatar, and Singapore, and General Data Protection Regulation-following EU countries including Italy, Greece, and Netherlands.

While Clearview's app is only supposed to be privately accessible to customers, Gizmodo found the Android application package in an unsecured Amazon S3 bucket. In addition to application tracking (Google Analytics, Crashlytics), it contains references to Google Play Services (Firebase or AppMeasurement), requests precise phone location data, and appeared to have features for voice search, sharing a free demo account to other users, augmented reality integration with Vuzix, and sending gallery photos or taking photos from the app itself. There were also references to scanning barcodes on a drivers license and to RealWear.

TechCrunch found the application for Apple iOS devices in an unsecured S3 bucket. The instructions showed how to load an enterprise (developer) certificate so the app could be installed without being published on the App Store. Clearview's access was suspended, as it was against Apple's terms of service for developers. This "effectively disables the app".

Buzzfeed discovered that Clearview also operates a secondary business, Insight Camera, which provides AI-enabled security cameras. It is targeted at "retail, banking and residential buildings". Two customers have used the technology, United Federation of Teachers and Rudin Management.

Accuracy
Documents from Clearview have claimed 98.6% or 100% accuracy while using their standard 99.6% confidence interval. Clearview provided an October 2019 document to the North Miami Police Department indicating they used a public review panel, consisting of Jonathan Lippman (former Chief Judge of the New York Court of Appeals, currently at Latham & Watkins, introduced via Richard Schwartz), Nicholas Cassimatis (businessperson), and Aaron Renn (formerly at Manhattan Institute) while using the methodology that ACLU used to test Amazon Rekognition. Jacob Snow of the ACLU responded, stating Clearview's test "couldn't be more different than the ACLU's work", pointed out the accuracy flaws and lack of actual racial bias methodology, and objected to Clearview implying that ACLU might endorse their "dangerous and untested surveillance product".

In 2021, Clearview announced that it was developing "deblur" and "mask removal" tools to sharpen blurred images and envision the covered part of an individual's face. These tools would be accomplished using machine learning models that fill in the missing details based on statistical patterns found in other images. Clearview acknowledged that deblurring an image and/or removing a mask could potentially make errors more frequently and would only be used to generate leads for police investigations.

Clearview ranked amongst the top 10 of 300 facial recognition algorithms in an accuracy test by the National Institute of Standards and Technology (NIST). The test determined how accurate Clearview's algorithm was at matching two different photos of the same person and did not test for matching an unknown face to its 10 billion image database. It was completed in October 2021 and was the sole third-party test of the app at the time.

Use

Customer list
Following a data leak of Clearview's customer list, Buzzfeed confirmed that 2,200 organizations in 27 countries have accounts with activity. Some may only have had trial access, and many organizations denied any connection to Clearview.

American law enforcement and government

Commercial and other non-government entities

International law enforcement

Cases
 New Zealand
The New Zealand Police used it in a trial after being approached by Clearview's Marko Jukic in January 2020. Jukic said it would have helped identify the Christchurch mosque shooter had the technology been available. During the police's trial they searched for people "of Māori or Polynesian ethnicity", as well as "Irish roof contractors" to determine its bias and accuracy. This raised strong objections once exposed, as neither the users' supervisors or the Privacy Commissioner were aware or approved of its use. After it was revealed by RNZ, Justice Minister Andrew Little stated "I don't know how it came to be that a person thought that this was a good idea", going on to say "It clearly wasn't endorsed, from the senior police hierarchy, and it clearly didn't get the endorsement from the [Police] Minister nor indeed from the wider cabinet ... that is a matter of concern."

 Florida
Clearview's technology was used for identifying an individual at a May 30, 2020 George Floyd police violence protest in Miami, Florida. Miami's WTVJ confirmed this, as the arrest report only said she was "identified through investigative means". The defendant's attorney did not even know it was with Clearview. Ton-That confirmed its use, noting that it was not being used for surveillance, but only to investigate a crime.

In another Florida case, Clearview's technology was used by defence attorneys to successfully locate a witness, resulting in the dismissal of vehicular homicide charges against the defendant.

Legal challenges
The company's claim of a First Amendment right to public information has been disputed by privacy lawyers such as Scott Skinner-Thompson and Margot Kaminski, highlighting the problems and precedents surrounding persistent surveillance and anonymity. Former New York City Police Commissioner and executive chairman of Teneo Risk Chief Bill Bratton challenged privacy concerns and recommended strong procedures for law enforcement usage in an op-ed in New York Daily News.

After the release of The New York Times January 2020 article, lawsuits were filed by the states of Illinois, California, Virginia and New York, citing violations of privacy and safety laws. Most of the lawsuits were transferred to New York's Southern District. Two lawsuits were filed in state courts; in Vermont by the attorney general and in Illinois on behalf of the American Civil Liberties Union, which cited a statute that forbids the corporate use of residents' faceprints without explicit consent. Clearview countered that an Illinois law does not apply to a company based in New York.

In response to a class action lawsuit filed in Illinois for violating the Biometric Information Privacy Act (BIPA), in May 2020 Clearview stated that they instituted a policy to stop working with non-government entities and to remove any photos geolocated in Illinois. On May 28, 2020, ACLU and Edelson sued Clearview in Illinois using the BIPA.

Clearview hired Tor Ekeland and Lee Wolosky of Jenner & Block for its legal team. Ekeland used Section 230 in his defense of Clearview in the lawsuit by the Attorney General of Vermont. Techdirt's Tim Cushing analyzed the arguments, stating "In essence, the lawsuit isn't about objectionable content hosted by Clearview, but objectionable actions by Clearview itself. That's why Section 230 doesn't apply. I'm not sure how the local court will read this, but it would seem readily apparent that Section 230 does not immunize Clearview in this case." The company also hired Paul Clement, a former Solicitor General and former acting United States Attorney General to help assuage privacy concerns.

In August 2020, The New York Times reported that Clearview had hired First Amendment and Pentagon Papers lawyer Floyd Abrams. Abrams has argued 13 cases in front of the Supreme Court of the United States, most notably Citizens United v. FEC, and stated that the issue of privacy rights versus free speech in the First Amendment could reach the Supreme Court.

In July 2020, Clearview AI announced that it was pulling out of the Canadian market amidst joint investigations into the company and the use of its product by police forces. Daniel Therrien, the Privacy Commissioner of Canada condemned Clearview AI's use of scraped biometric data:

In June 2021, Therrien found that the Royal Canadian Mounted Police had broken Canadian privacy law through hundreds of illegal searches using Clearview AI.

In January 2021, Clearview AI's biometric photo database was deemed illegal in the EU by the Hamburg data protection authority (DPA). The deletion of a affected person's biometric data was ordered. The authority stated that GDPR is applicable despite the fact that Clearview AI has no European branch. In March 2020, they had requested Clearview AI's customer list, as data protection obligations would also apply to the customers. The data protection advocacy organization NOYB criticized the DPA's decision as the DPA issued an order protecting only the individual complainant instead of an order banning the collection of any European resident's photos.

In November 2021, Clearview received a provisional notice by the UK's Information Commissioner's Office (ICO) to stop processing its citizens' data citing a range of alleged breaches. The company was also notified of a potential fine of approximately $22.6 million. Clearview claimed that the ICO's allegations were factually inaccurate which it would consider appealing as the company "does not do business in the UK, and does not have any UK customers at this time." The ICO released a statement that a final determination on Clearview would be occur until mid-2022. The BBC reported on 23 May that the company had been fined "more than £7.5m by the UK's privacy watchdog and told to delete the data of UK residents."

In May 2022, Clearview agreed to settle a 2020 lawsuit from the ACLU, which prohibited the sale of its facial recognition database to private individuals and businesses. Clearview paid $250,000 in legal fees and agreed to limit its 20 billion facial photo database to government agencies.

In May 2022, Clearview was ordered to delete all data belonging to UK residents’ facial recognition data by the country’s privacy watchdog, the Information Commissioner’s Office (IOC). Additionally, the ICO fined Clearview £7.5 million for failing to follow the UK’s data protection laws. This fine marked the fourth of its type placed on Clearview, after similar orders and fines issued from Australia, France, and Italy.

See also
 hiQ Labs v. LinkedIn

References 

2017 establishments in New York City
American companies established in 2017
Companies based in Manhattan
Detectives
Facial recognition software
Internet-related controversies
Mass surveillance